Instructor may refer to:

Education
 Instructor, a teacher of a specialised subject that involves skill:
 Teaching assistant
 Tutor
 Lecturer
 Fellow
 Teaching fellow
 Teaching associate
 Graduate student instructor
 Professor

Specialists
 Drill instructor
 Driving instructor
 Flight instructor
 Physical training instructor
 Ski instructor
 Swimming instructor

Publications
 Juvenile Instructor, the official periodical of The Church of Jesus Christ of Latter-day Saints (LDS Church) between 1901 and 1930
 The Instructor, the official periodical of The Church of Jesus Christ of Latter-day Saints (LDS Church) between 1930 and 1970
 Instructor, a trade magazine for teachers published by Scholastic Corporation

Other uses
 Ground Instructor, a certificate issued in the US by the Federal Aviation Administration

See also
 List of academic ranks
 Demonstrator (disambiguation)